Charles Frederick Burns (February 14, 1936 – November 5, 2021) was an American-born Canadian professional ice hockey forward who played 749 games in the National Hockey League (NHL) with the Detroit Red Wings, Boston Bruins, Oakland Seals, Pittsburgh Penguins, and Minnesota North Stars between 1958 and 1973. He later worked as the head coach of Minnesota in both 1970 and 1974–75. Burns was mainly known for being an excellent skater, playmaker and defensive player who performed checking and penalty-killing. His trademark was the heavily padded helmet that he was forced to wear after suffering a serious head injury while playing junior hockey in 1954–55.

Playing career
In 1959, he was the only US-born player in the NHL. Burns was born in Detroit, Michigan, his family moved to Toronto, Ontario, when he was a child. Burns chose Canadian citizenship when he turned 21 and later played for the 1958 world champion Whitby Dunlops.

Post-playing career
Burns had three spells as a player-coach, twice with the San Francisco Seals (1965–66 and 1966–67) and one with the Minnesota North Stars (1969–70). He coached the North Stars again in 1974–75 after his retirement. Curiously, all of these were midseason assignments. He coached youth hockey for the Wallingford Hawks of Wallingford, Connecticut in his spare time. Burns died in Wallingford, Connecticut on November 5, 2021 at the age of 85.

Career statistics

Regular season and playoffs

Coaching record

References

External links 
 

1936 births
2021 deaths
American men's ice hockey centers
American ice hockey coaches
Boston Bruins players
California Golden Seals coaches
Canadian ice hockey centres
Canadian ice hockey coaches
Detroit Red Wings players
Ice hockey coaches from Michigan
Ice hockey people from Detroit
Ice hockey people from Toronto
Ice hockey player-coaches
Kingston Frontenacs (EPHL) players
Minnesota North Stars coaches
Minnesota North Stars players
New Haven Nighthawks players
Oakland Seals players
Ontario Hockey Association Senior A League (1890–1979) players
Pittsburgh Penguins players
San Francisco Seals (ice hockey) players
Sportspeople from Detroit
Toronto Marlboros players